Ismail J. "Izzy" Ramsey is an American lawyer who is the nominee to serve as United States attorney for the Northern District of California.

Education 

Ramsey graduated from Berkeley High School in 1985. He earned a Bachelor of Arts from Harvard College in 1989, a Master of Business Administration from the Haas School of Business in 1996, and a Juris Doctor from Harvard Law School in 1996.

Career 
In 1996 and 1997, Ramsey served as a law clerk for Judge Harry T. Edwards. From 1997 to 1999 and 2003 to 2005, he worked as an associate at Keker, Van Nest & Peters LLP. From 1999 to 2003, he served as an assistant United States attorney in the United States Attorney's Office for the Northern District of California. Since 2006, he has been a partner at Ramsey & Ehrlich LLP in Berkeley, California. He is a veteran of the United States Air Force. Ramsey is an adjunct professor at the University of California at Berkeley School of Law and Stanford Law School.

Nomination as U.S. attorney 

On November 29, 2022, President Joe Biden nominated Ramsey to be the United States attorney for the Northern District of California. On January 3, 2023, his nomination was returned to the president under Rule XXXI, Paragraph 6 of the United States Senate. He was renominated on January 23, 2023. On February 16, 2023, his nomination was reported out of the Senate Judiciary Committee by a 17–4 vote. His nomination is pending before the United States Senate.

References 

Living people
Year of birth missing (living people)
20th-century American lawyers
21st-century American lawyers
African-American lawyers
California lawyers
Harvard College alumni
Harvard Law School alumni
Haas School of Business alumni
Stanford Law School faculty
UC Berkeley School of Law faculty
University of California, Berkeley alumni